Rein Voog (born 2 November 1964 in Tallinn) is an Estonian politician. He was a member of IX Riigikogu.

He has been a member of Estonian Reform Party.

References

Living people
1964 births
Members of the Riigikogu, 1999–2003
Members of the Riigikogu, 1995–1999